Newton Upper Falls is one of the thirteen villages within the city of Newton in Middlesex County, Massachusetts, United States.

The area borders Needham, Massachusetts to the southwest, Wellesley, Massachusetts to the west, the West Roxbury neighborhood of Boston to the extreme southeast, Newton Highlands to the north and northeast, Waban to the northwest and Oak Hill to the east.

The village is served partially by Eliot "T" station, part of the Green Line D branch of the MBTA, with rapid light rail service inbound into downtown Boston and outbound to Riverside.  Major roads that serve the village are Route 128, and Route 9 (Boylston Street), which provides a direct, 6 mile commute into downtown Boston.

Newton's first mill on the Charles River was built in 1688 in Upper Falls.  Over the next 150 years, the water power available at Upper Falls led to the village's steady growth as many more mills were built along that stretch of the river.  By 1850 the village had 1300 inhabitants which was 25% of the entire population of Newton.

Newton Upper Falls is home to the Hemlock Gorge and Echo Bridge, a large aqueduct turned pedestrian walkway over the Charles River. It is said to be the only village that has retained its original name from when the area was founded in the 17th century. It has over 150 homes on the historic register despite its small area.

In 1909, a Roman Catholic church called Mary Immaculate of Lourdes opened in Upper Falls.

Sullivan Avenue, an unpaved private road in Newton Upper Falls is the last remaining portion of the ancient highway connecting Boston and Cambridge with Newton and points west in the 17th century (back then it was called Cambridge Village). Also on Sullivan Avenue is a famous pothole; not the kind you avoid with your car, but a geological anomaly where a boulder that was originally pushed down the cliff by a now extinct waterfall got caught and became round. The boulder spun around in its place carving a shaft over thousands of years. Since then half the shaft collapsed and now all that can be seen is half of a cylindrical shaft through the cliff at the corner of Sullivan and Elliot Streets.

A  area, including much of the area between Route 9 and Elliot Street, and east from the Charles River to Cottage Street and Hickory Cliff Road, was listed on the National Register of Historic Places in 1986.

Newton Upper Falls is also the teenage home of comedian and podcaster Joe Rogan. Where he graduated from Newton South High School in 1985.

See also
 National Register of Historic Places listings in Newton, Massachusetts

References

External links
The 13 Villages of Newton
Dunn Gaherin's - a popular neighborhood pub
The Friends of Hemlock Gorge
Makers of the Mold - a History of Newton Upper Falls

Villages in Newton, Massachusetts
Villages in Massachusetts
National Register of Historic Places in Newton, Massachusetts
Historic districts in Middlesex County, Massachusetts
Historic districts on the National Register of Historic Places in Massachusetts